A mole shrew is a shrew that resembles a mole. Species with this name include:
Two species in the genus Surdisorex, native to Kenya:
Aberdare mole shrew (Surdisorex norae)
Mt. Kenya mole shrew (Surdisorex polulus)
Four species in the genus Anourosorex, native to Asia:
Assam mole shrew (Anourosorex assamensis)
Giant mole shrew (Anourosorex schmidi) 
Chinese mole shrew (Anourosorex squamipes). 
Taiwanese mole shrew (Anourosorex yamashinai)